In 1962, the Ohio Department of Highways implemented the system of Interstate Highways that had been approved by the states in 1956.

The State Route numbers 70, 71, 74, 75, 77, 80, 90, 270, 271, 275, 277, 280, 290, 675, and 680 conflicted with new designations, so the State Routes with those numbers were renumbered. However, there is no Interstate 290 in Ohio anymore, so 290 is a possible state route number again.

Other renumberings due to new interstate designations after 1962
In 1972, due to the designation of I-76 in Ohio, Ohio State Route 76 had the part north of Beverly renumbered to Ohio State Route 83 and the rest became a southward extension of Ohio State Route 339.  

In 1973, due to the designation of I-670 in Ohio, Ohio State Route 670 had the portion east of Ohio State Route 313 become an extension of it and the rest was renumbered to Ohio State Route 761.

References

 Renumbering 1962
Ohio State Highway Renumbering, 1962
State Highway Renumbering, 1962 
History of Ohio
Highway renumbering in the United States